The 1993 season was Molde's 19th season in the top flight of Norwegian football. This season Molde competed in Tippeligaen and the Norwegian Cup.

In Tippeligaen, Molde finished in 10th position and had to play relegation play-offs against second tier teams Strømsgodset and Bryne. Molde finished the play-offs in second place and were relegated to 1. divisjon after having lost 0–2 at home against Strømsgodset and drew 2–2 away against Bryne. 

Molde participated in the 1993 Norwegian Cup. They reached the quarter-finals where they were knocked out after losing 0–2 away to Brann.

Squad
Source:

Friendlies

Competitions

Tippeligaen

Results summary

Positions by round

Results

League table

Relegation play-offs
Due to their tenth-place finish in Tippeligaen, Molde contested in the play-offs for qualification to next season's Tippeligaen. Molde drew in the away game against Bryne (2nd in the 1. divisjon - Group B) and lost at home against Strømsgodset (2nd in the 1. divisjon - Group A). Strømsgodset won both their games and were promoted to Tippeligaen. Molde were relegated to the 1. divisjon.

Norwegian Cup

Squad statistics

Appearances and goals
Lacking information:
Appearance statistics from Norwegian Cup quarter-final and relegation play-offs 1st leg are incomplete.
One goalscorer in Norwegian Cup second round (against Byåsen) is missing.

    

 

  

|}

Goalscorers

See also
Molde FK seasons

References

External links
nifs.no

1993
Molde